Wayne Walker may refer to:

Wayne Walker (linebacker) (1936–2017), American football player
Wayne Walker (politician), New Zealand politician
Wayne Walker (wide receiver) (born 1966), American football player